The Church of Santa Maria Primerana is a Roman Catholic church located in the Tuscan town of Fiesole. It encloses the eastern end of Piazza Mino, next to the Praetorian Palace.

History 
First mentioned in AD 966, the church was built atop the stylobate of a Roman temple, from which a pietra serena pillar was incorporated into the church's north wall. There is also a Roman  running north–south that flanks the church. Moreover, findings of nearby Lombard sepulchres indicates that the church was once an early Christian site. The church occupies a prominent position in Piazza Mino, near the Fiesole Cathedral. Due to an image inside of the Virgin Mary it appears that the church is the site of the oldest instance of veneration of the Madonna in the Diocese of Fiesole, which would form the basis for "Primerana" in the church's name. 

Santa Maria Primerana was expanded in the Middle Ages. From this period, the Gothic chancel remains. A new façade was built at the end of the 16th century in the Mannerist style. The interior was decorated with sgraffito decor by Ludovico Buti.

The portico, which is constituted by an architrave supported by columns of the Ionic order, dates to 1801.

The interior consists of a single transept room. The high altar was constructed between 1745 and 1767 by Bernardino Ciruini. On the altar is a 13th-century tablet by Maestro di Rovezzano, which depicts the Madonna and Child.

In the transept are two marble bas-reliefs by Francesco da Sangallo. One dates to 1542 and is a Self-portrait of the artist; the other dates to 1575 and is a Portrait of Francesco del Fede. Also in the transept is a glazed terracotta from Andrea della Robbia's workshop depicting the Crucifix between the Madonna, St. John, Mary Magdalene and Angels. There is, additionally, a large, painted, wooden crucifix designed in the Giotto school from the 14th-century, which is attributed to Bonaccorso di Cino.

The faded remains of frescoes on the walls are by Niccolò di Pietro Gerini.

Image gallery

See also 

 Fiesole Cathedral
 San Francesco Monastery (Fiesole)
 Episcopal Seminary of Fiesole
 Episcopal Palace, Fiesole

References

External links 

 Diocese of Fiesole

Churches in the metropolitan city of Florence
966 establishments
Gothic architecture in Tuscany
Mannerist architecture in Italy
Renaissance architecture in Tuscany
Buildings and structures in Fiesole
10th-century churches in Italy